Li Mingcai (born August 22, 1971) is a retired male race walker from PR China. He competed for his native country at two consecutive Summer Olympics, starting in 1992.

Achievements

References

sports-reference

1971 births
Living people
Athletes (track and field) at the 1992 Summer Olympics
Athletes (track and field) at the 1996 Summer Olympics
Chinese male racewalkers
Olympic athletes of China
Asian Games medalists in athletics (track and field)
Athletes (track and field) at the 1990 Asian Games
Asian Games bronze medalists for China
Medalists at the 1990 Asian Games